Bearden School District may refer to:
 Bearden School District (Arkansas) 
 Bearden School District (Oklahoma)